Tom Hornsey (born 17 February 1989) is a former Australian-born punter. Hornsey was the Ray Guy Award winner in 2013, recognized as the best college football punter in America.

Australian rules football
Hornsey is from Geelong, Victoria, Australia.  He played Australian rules football, and played in the championship of the Geelong Football League.  In 2008, he was listed on the roster of the Geelong VFL Football Club of the VFL.

College career
Hornsey attended the University of Memphis in Memphis, Tennessee, where he was the starting punter for the Memphis Tigers football team from 2010 to 2013.  As a senior in 2013, he had 62 punts for 2,800 yards, an average of 45.32 yards per punt.  He was a recognized as consensus first-team All-American, having received first-team honors from the American Football Coaches Association, Associated Press, Football Writers Association of America, and USA Today, and won the Ray Guy Award recognizing him as the best college football punter in the nation.  He finished his four-year college career with 297 punts for 12,815 yards, with an average punt of 43.1 yards.

Professional career
Hornsey went undrafted in the 2014 NFL Draft.

Tom was with the New York Jets during rookie minicamp.

On 11 August 2014, Hornsey signed with the Dallas Cowboys. The Cowboys released Hornsey on 26 August 2014.

Hornsey had an average punt distance of 50.2 yards, the best in NFL preseason, with a 63 yard long, in 2 game (5 punts) with Dallas.

Hornsey had workouts with both the Tampa Bay Buccaneers and Pittsburgh Steelers either during or after the 2014 season.

Hornsey signed with the Dallas Cowboys as a free agent on 19 February 2015.

Hornsey was cut by the Dallas Cowboys on Tuesday, 1 September 2015 as part of the first wave of NFL roster cuts in order for each team to get down to the required 75 players.

References

1989 births
Living people
Sportspeople from Geelong
Geelong Falcons players
American football punters
Memphis Tigers football players
Dallas Cowboys players
Australian players of American football
All-American college football players
Footballers who switched code